Varsity is an American indie rock band from Chicago, Illinois.

History
Varsity released a song on their Bandcamp page in 2013 titled "Turns Out", with a B-Side titled "Downtown". Varsity released their first EP titled Thanks For Nothing in 2014. Varsity released their self-titled first full-length album in 2015. In 2015, Varsity released a new song titled "Cult of Personality", with a B-Side titled "So Sad, So Sad". In mid 2016, Varsity released a song titled "Smash", with a B-Side titled "Still Apart". On April 27, 2018 Varsity released their sophomore record, Parallel Person, on Babe City Records.

On October 30, 2018, Varsity announced their signing with Boston-based independent label Run For Cover Records and released two new singles, "The Dogs Only Listen To Him" and "UFO".

Band members
 Current members
Stephanie Smith – lead vocals, percussion, piano, keyboards, synthesizers (2013–present)
Dylan Weschler – guitars, backing vocals (2013–present)
Patrick Stanton – guitars (2013–present)
Paul Stolz – bass (2013–present)
Jake Stolz – drums, percussion (2015–present)

 Former members
Spencer Smith – drums, percussion (2013–2015)

Discography
Studio albums
Varsity (2015; self-released, Jurassic Pop)
Parallel Person (2018; Babe City)
 Fine Forever (2020; Run For Cover)

EPs
Thanks for Nothing (2014; self-released)
Limited Edition Tour Tape (2016; self-released)

Singles
"Turns Out" / "Downtown" (2013; self-released)
"Cult of Personality" / "So Sad, So Sad" (2015; self-released)
"Eye to Eye" / "Kelly" (2016; self-released)
"Smash" / "Still Apart" (2016; self-released)
"The Dogs Only Listen to Him" / "UFO" (2018, Run For Cover)

Compilations
 Singles (2016; self-released)
 The Basement Takes (2015–2016) (2019, Run For Cover)

References

Musical groups from Chicago
Musical groups established in 2013
2013 establishments in Illinois